Denisa Baránková (born 7 September 2001) is a Slovak archer. Denisa made her debut in Slovak national team in 2017 and since then competed at numerous international tournaments such as 2019 European Games.
She competed in the women's individual event at the 2020 Summer Olympics.
At 2021 European Field championship she became first Slovak archer to ever qualify for World Games.

She represented Slovakia at the 2022 World Games held in Birmingham, United States. She competed in the women's individual recurve event.

References

2001 births
Living people
Slovak female archers
Olympic archers of Slovakia
Archers at the 2020 Summer Olympics
Sportspeople from Bratislava
21st-century Slovak women
Competitors at the 2022 World Games